"I Get Up" was a song by Australian rock band INXS, released as a non-album single on 10 November 2003. The song was written by Andrew Farriss and Jon Stevens. It was the first new material from INXS since their former frontman, Michael Hutchence, committed suicide on 22 November 1997. The lead singer on "I Get Up" is former Noiseworks frontman Jon Stevens. It is the only studio recorded material by INXS with Stevens singing. Stevens resigned from INXS by the end of 2003 because of "differing views" about the bands' future.

Track listing
Australian CD single
 "I Get Up" – 3:30
 "I Get Up" (Rogue Traders radio edit) – 3:30
 "I Get Up" (Rogue Traders full version) – 6:40

Charts

References

2003 singles
2003 songs
INXS songs
Mercury Records singles
Songs written by Andrew Farriss
Songs written by Jon Stevens